Forrest Lee Preston (born March 22, 1933) is an American billionaire businessman from Massachusetts. He is the founder, owner, chairman and chief executive officer (CEO) of Life Care Centers of America, a long-term elderly care company he founded in 1970.

Early life
Forrest Lee Preston was born and grew up in Massachusetts, the son of a Seventh-day Adventist pastor father, Benjamin M. Preston and his wife Ethel Preston. His father died in 1994, and Preston endowed the Benjamin M. Preston scholarship at Atlantic Union College, of which his father was an alumnus.

He was educated at Walla Walla College and Oregon State University. His original intent was to become a medical doctor, and he became a certified X-Ray technician.

Career
Preston moved to Cleveland, Tennessee, in the late 1950s a few years after his brother Winton Russell Preston, who had come to study at Southern Missionary College in nearby Collegedale.

Together with his brother Winton, he co-founded a company called Hospital Publications to create patient booklets and public relations materials for hospitals, and the company operated until 1972. The idea had come from his work in hospitals, where he concluded that there was a need for better public relations in the healthcare system. Through this business, he observed the conditions of elderly patients in hospitals, and concluded that there was a need for better long term care.

In 1970, Preston founded Life Care Centers of America in Cleveland, and is the sole owner, chairman and CEO. It later grew to be the largest privately owned long term care facility chain and the third largest privately owned long-term care facility in the United States.

As of September 2015, he had an estimated net worth of US$2.1 billion.

Personal life
Preston was married to Kathleen Marchant (1936-2017) until her death. He lives in Cleveland. His residence is located near the residence of fellow businessman Allan Jones. He is of the Baptist faith, and attends First Baptist Church in Cleveland.

References

1933 births
Living people
People from Massachusetts
People from Cleveland, Tennessee
Walla Walla University alumni
Oregon State University alumni
American company founders
Businesspeople from Tennessee
American chairpersons of corporations
American chief executives
American billionaires
Baptists from Tennessee